Hwarangdae station was a railway station on the Gyeongchun Line in South Korea, which started operation in 1939 under the name Taereung station (태릉역). It was renamed Hwarangdae in 1958. It was closed in 2010 and is currently preserved as a museum. The wooden building is a registered cultural heritage property since 2006.

References 

Defunct railway stations in South Korea
Cultural Heritage of early modern times of South Korea